Black Magic is a studio album by Chicago blues musician Magic Sam. Delmark Records released it under the name of "Magic Sam Blues Band" in November 1969, shortly before his death. The album was a follow-up to Magic Sam's highly influential studio debut, West Side Soul (1968), and also includes a mix of originals with songs written by his contemporaries.

Critical reception

Bill Dahl, in a review for AllMusic, gave the album its highest ratingfive out of five stars. He called it "another instant classic" and noted some R&B-style influenced songs.  

Blues historian Gerard Herzhaft commented that the album, along with West Side Soul, "brought unanimous praise from the critics. Today [1996], they are considered classics of the Chicago blues".

In 1990, Black Magic was inducted into the Blues Hall of Fame as a classic of blues recording. The induction statement includes:

Track listing 
Side A
 "I Just Want a Little Bit" – 3:03
 "What Have I Done Wrong" – 3:10
 "Easy, Baby" – 3:54
 "You Belong to Me" – 4:05
 "It's All Your Fault" – 4:50
Side B
 "I Have the Same Old Blues" – 3:32
 "You Don't Love Me Baby" – 3:29
 "San-Ho-Zay" – 3:53
 "Stop! You're Hurting Me" – 4:47
 "Keep Loving Me Baby"– 3:30

Personnel
Magic Samvocals, guitar
Eddie Shawtenor saxophone
Lafayette Leakepiano
Mighty Joe Youngguitar
Mack Thompsonbass
Odie Payne Jr.drums

References

1968 albums
Magic Sam albums
Delmark Records albums
Albums produced by Bob Koester